Amit Sadh (born 5 June 1979) is an Indian actor. He is known for his roles in films like Kai Po Che (2013), Guddu Rangeela (2015), and Sarkar 3 (2017). He began his acting career with the teen drama Kyun Hota Hai Pyarrr and later appeared in the reality shows Nach Baliye 1, Bigg Boss 1 and Fear Factor India. He played the role of Kshitij in Shobna Desai's soap opera Durgesh Nandinii that aired on Sony Entertainment Television. Sadh was recently seen in the web series Breathe (2018) and its second season Breathe: Into the Shadows (2020) playing Inspector Kabir Sawant.

Early life
Sadh was born on 5 June 1979 in Delhi. He completed his graduation from La Martiniere College, Lucknow. Sadh's father Ram Chandra Dogra, was a national-level hockey player. Sadh lost his father when he was only 16 years old.

His family home is in Punjab. At the age of 21, he left home and moved to Mumbai to become an actor.

Career

Television career (2002–2008)
Sadh's first major role was in Neena Gupta's production Kyun Hota Hai Pyarrr, where he portrayed the character of Aditya. He then starred in the series Kohinoor. He appeared as a contestant on the reality show Bigg Boss. Sadh participated in the original seasons of Nach Baliye and Fear Factor.

Film career (2010–present)
Sadh has played important supporting roles in several movies. He worked in Kai Po Che! playing the role of a priest's son alongside Amrita Puri, Rajkummar Rao and Sushant Singh Rajput. In Sultan, he played the role of a businessman alongside Salman Khan and Anushka Sharma. He  appeared in Gold as Raghubir Pratap Singh, based on the real life character of K. D. Singh Babu alongside Akshay Kumar and played the role of Shakuntala Devi's son-in-law in Shakuntala Devi.

In 2018, he featured as Inspector Kabir Sawant in the web series Breathe, and reprised his role in Breathe: Into the Shadows. In 2020, he played the role of Major Videep Singh in Avrodh: The Siege Within which was a fictionalized retelling of the 2016 Uri attack and the following surgical strikes. He donned the role of retired Indian Army special forces officer Major Deependra Singh Sengar in Jeet Ki Zid.

Filmography

Films

Television

Web series

Awards and nominations

References

External links 

 
 

Indian male television actors
Living people
Bigg Boss (Hindi TV series) contestants
Fear Factor: Khatron Ke Khiladi participants
1979 births